Anisocanthon pygmaeus is a species of true dung beetle that is found in Entre Ríos, Santa Fe and Buenos Aires Provinces in Argentina, and is believed to also be found in Rio Grande do Sul in Brazil. It has not been recorded in the last 60 years.

References

Deltochilini
Endemic fauna of Argentina
Beetles described in 1911